Cotyabanycha is a genus of long-horned beetles in the family Cerambycidae. There is one described species in Cotyabanycha, C. ocularis.

References

Further reading

 

Cerambycidae
Articles created by Qbugbot